Jean Baptiste de Champaigne (10 December 1631, in Brussels – 27 October 1681, in Paris), was a Flemish Baroque painter and teacher.

Biography

According to the Netherlands Institute for Art History (RKD), he was the nephew of Philippe de Champaigne who moved to Paris to become his pupil in 1643. In 1658 he undertook a trip to Italy to copy the works of Raphael and Titian. When he returned he became a member of the Brussels Guild of Saint Luke, and in 1671 he accepted a post as teacher in the prestigious Académie de peinture et de sculpture in Paris.

According to Houbraken he was very fortunate to have survived longer than Philippe's own children so that he was brought up like a true son.

References

External links

1627 births
1679 deaths
Flemish Baroque painters
Artists from Brussels
Painters from Brussels